Joy is a 1929 novel by the French writer Georges Bernanos. The story is set among people with shattered dreams and follows a young woman who is defined by youthfulness and joy. The book was awarded the Prix Femina. It was published in English in 1946 in a translation by Louise Varèse.

Reception
Franz Carl Weiskopf wrote in The Saturday Review: "If you wish an exalted tale, brilliant dialogue, and fervent description of mystical ecstasies, then Joy is the right kind of book for you. If you don't, even a magnificent literary craftsmanship and an extraordinary power of language will not compensate you for the lack of contact with the author's emotions and thoughts."

References

1929 French novels
French-language novels
Novels by Georges Bernanos
Plon (publisher) books